Tania Rosser (born 15 April 1978) is a New Zealand-born Irish rugby union player. She has featured in three World Cup's including the 2014 World Cup. She earned her 50th cap when they defeated the Black Ferns.

Tania has also represented Ireland at netball and will be featuring in the Irish Mixed Touch Team at the 2016 European Champsionship in July.

Tania represented the Irish touch rugby team in Malaysian World Cup 2018 where her team with Billy Ngawini came in sixth place.

At the end of 2021 Tania was announced the head coach of The Leinster Women's team, being the first female head coach in Leinster.

In 2022 Tania is organising the Irish youths' Touch, The under 15s Irish Mix team which her son Serge Broughton plays and is one day going to be up there with the legends like Peter Walters. The under 18 men's and under 18 girls'.
Manager for the Irish Mix Open with head coach Billy Ngawini.

References

External links
Irish Rugby Player Profile

1978 births
Living people
Irish female rugby union players
Irish people of New Zealand descent
Ireland women's international rugby union players
Leinster Rugby women's players
Irish netball players
New Zealand netball players